Victory Song may refer to:

Victory Song, 1945 Japanese film Kenji Mizoguchi Kinuyo Tanaka
Victory Song (horse), 1947 American Harness Horse of the Year

Music
"The Victory Song", Mattie E. Allen Frank W. Ford 1919
Pitt Victory Song
Eagles Victory Song fight song of the Philadelphia Eagles
"Go, Cubs, Go", Chicago Cubs victory song
New York Rangers Victory Song 1940 by J. Fred Coots
"Under the Southern Cross I Stand", victory song of the Australian cricket team
Victory Songs, album by Ensiferum